ZTT Records is a British record label founded in 1983 by record producer Trevor Horn, Horn's wife and businesswoman Jill Sinclair, and New Musical Express (NME) journalist Paul Morley. The label's name was also stylised as ZANG TUMB TUUM and ZANG TUUM TUMB on various releases.

In December 2017, Universal Music Group (UMG) acquired ZTT Records, along with Stiff Records. The ZTT and Stiff back catalogues were licensed to BMG Rights Management under Union Square Music until 2022, when Universal relaunched the label.

History
ZTT is an initialism of Filippo Tommaso Marinetti's sound poem Zang Tumb Tumb, which described 'zang tumb tumb' as the sound of a machine gun. It is believed that they likely got the idea for the name via John McGeoch, who produced the Swedish pop-funk band Zzzang Tumb's eponymous 1983 album around the same time as the label was founded.

The majority of the creative team at ZTT had first assembled when Horn produced the album The Lexicon of Love for the British pop band ABC. A precursor to ZTT was the short-lived Perfect Recordings label, spun off from the newly founded Perfect Songs publishing subsidiary of Trevor Horn and Jill Sinclair's company. Perfect Recordings only released The Buggles' Adventures in Modern Recording, along with the singles derived from it.

In 1983, Horn, Sinclair and Morley founded ZTT Records, which after a slow start boomed. Sinclair became ZTT's managing director, while Paul Morley concentrated on marketing. In the same year, Sinclair and Horn acquired Basing Street Studios from Island Records in exchange for distributing the ZTT label.

ZTT's first signing was Frankie Goes to Hollywood (FGTH), whose hits Relax and Two Tribes were among the most influential and best-selling singles of the decade. It was the label's second single, Relax, that became the label's first number one in January 1984. Relax stayed in the UK Singles Chart for a full year, and ZTT was well and truly established. During the 1980s, Grace Jones and Art of Noise were other ZTT acts to chart. ZTT Records also helped define the structure and formats of the UK pop music scene; as part of their marketing efforts to prolong the life of a single release, ZTT issued multiple 12" remixes which charted at positions in their own right as a separate 12" single. ZTT Records also licensed or produced t-shirts with graphic messages  related to its artists' singles (eg. Frankie Say Arm the Unemployed  ), which themselves became 1980s icons. ZTT were unafraid to invert the business of pop and turn it into entertainment.

In 1984, the Horn-Sinclair family businesses were reorganised as SPZ Group, which then consisted of Sarm West Studios, Perfect Songs, and ZTT Records. From the beginning, the majority of ZTT releases were published by Perfect Songs, and recorded at Sarm West Studios.  The latter part of the decade was eclipsed by a bitter legal battle between ZTT and Holly Johnson, who fought his way out of the strict, long recording agreement. Similarly, other ZTT artists, such as Art of Noise and Propaganda, were disenchanted and left the label.  Propaganda's case was settled out of court; Johnson won his outright.

By  the late 1980s, ZTT began to focus on the emerging dance music scene.  Manchester trance group 808 State would reach the top 10 with Pacific State, and three other singles and one album during the early 1990s. Seal was the next major ZTT act to emerge in the 1990s, and the label also scored hits with MC Tunes and Shades of Rhythm.

ZTT Records have produced forty-five Top 40 hits in the United Kingdom, fifteen of which were Top 10 hits.

In May 2022, UMG released the new album by Propaganda vocalists Claudia Brücken and Susanne Freytag on the reactivated ZTT Label. Credited to xPropaganda, the album was recorded with producer Stephen Lipson, titled The Heart Is Strange and received a generally positive reception.

Music videos and cover art

ZTT Records pioneered music video and cover art as forms of high art in their own right.  Paul Morley commissioned videos from then-unknown directors, who would go on to become acclaimed in their field, such as Anton Corbijn, Godley & Creme, Zbigniew Rybczyński and Andy Morahan.

Morley also commissioned early ZTT sleeve design and photography to pioneers of the medium such as Malcolm Garrett, Anton Corbijn, Mark Farrow and Jean-Paul Goude.

The label's work in the visual field was profiled by Tony Enoch in Design Week, who positioned ZTT as "from a time when a record label meant something – a happening, a sense of belonging.  Labels defined people's youth.  Think Apple, Virgin, Beggar's Banquet, ZTT, and Stiff: small, independent British labels appearing to be able to do anything they wanted, reinventing the rules."

In 2008, journalist Ian Peel curated a first exhibition of ZTT sleeve art for galleries in London and Tokyo, and in 2013, he curated the visual archives of ZTT and Sarm West Studios before the studios were demolished.  In 2009, Peel compiled a DVD of the labels' most acclaimed videos, entitled 'The Television is Watching You', which received a British Board of Film Classification (BBFC) 15 Certificate.

Notable acts on the ZTT label

† as one-time UK distributor for Tommy Boy Records

Action Series

As part of ZTT internal cataloguing of releases, they maintained two series; the Action Series, and the Incidental Series.  The Action Series was issued mainly to singles and albums by a majority of the labels artists.  However to confuse matters, the series also contains a booklet and a concert.

The Action series paused in 1988, and was restarted by record label manager Ian Peel in 2012.

See also

Lists of record labels
List of electronic music record labels
List of independent UK record labels

References

External links

 
British record labels
Record labels established in 1983
Electronic music record labels
Drum and bass record labels
Electronic dance music record labels
Alternative rock record labels
New wave record labels
British independent record labels
Indie rock record labels
Pop record labels
IFPI members